The 2013 Mahabubnagar bus accident occurred on 30 October when a private Volvo bus on the way from Bangalore to Hyderabad caught fire after hitting a culvert while overtaking a car, killing 45 people and injuring another seven. The accident took place at Palem village, Mahbubnagar district, then in Indian state of Andhra Pradesh (but after 2 June 2014 in Telangana) at 5.30 AM.

Accident
The bus, which belonged to a local tour operator Jabbar Travels left Bangalore at 11 pm on 29 October, with 49 passengers on board.  The accident happened when the bus driver tried to overtake a car but hit a culvert and damaged its diesel tank in the process leading to the fire. However the bus driver, cleaner and five other passengers managed to escape the bus.

See also
 List of traffic collisions (2010–present)

References

Bus incidents in India
2013 road incidents
2013 disasters in India
Fires in India
History of Andhra Pradesh (1947–2014)
Disasters in Telangana
Disasters in Andhra Pradesh
October 2013 events in India